Gowans is a surname. Notable people with the name include:

 Alan Gowans (1923–2001), art historian and academic
 Betty Gowans (born 1947), Canadian sprint canoer
 Brad Gowans (1903–1954), American jazz trombonist and reedist
 Chris Gowans (born 1977), Australian rules football player
 Fred R. Gowans (born 1936), American professor who specializes in the fur trade in the American West
 James Gowans (disambiguation), multiple people, including:
James Gowans (architect) (1821–1890), Scottish architect and quarry owner
James Gowans (rugby union) (1872–1936), Scottish rugby union player
James Learmonth Gowans (born 1924), English immunologist
James Gowans (Australian footballer) (born 1977), Australian footballer
 John Gowans (1934–2012), British General of The Salvation Army
 Peter Gowans (1944–2009), Scottish football winger 
 Tony Gowans, New Zealand football player
 William Gowans (1803–1870), American bookseller

See also
 Gowan (disambiguation)
 McGowan